Pam Alexis is a Canadian politician, who was elected to the Legislative Assembly of British Columbia in the 2020 British Columbia general election. She represents the electoral district of Abbotsford-Mission as a member of the British Columbia New Democratic Party.

She was first elected as a School Trustee in 2005, and won a seat on Mission Council in 2014. In 2018, she won the city's mayoral race.

Prior to politics, she served on several boards and non-profits, including the Mission Chamber of Commerce (Vice-President), the Rotary Club of Mission Midday, and the Sunshine Rotary Club, where she also served as President and earned four Paul Harris Fellowships. She is a former Vice-President for the BC Winter Games.

Electoral Record

References

21st-century Canadian politicians
21st-century Canadian women politicians
British Columbia New Democratic Party MLAs
Women MLAs in British Columbia
Mayors of Mission, British Columbia
Women mayors of places in British Columbia
Living people
Year of birth missing (living people)